Robert J. Mayo (August 25, 1951 – February 23, 2004) was an American session keyboardist and guitarist, perhaps best known for his work with Peter Frampton.

Biography 
Mayo was born in New York City, and grew up in Westchester County. He began studying music at the age of five, focusing on classical piano. During the 1960s, Mayo's interest in music grew due to the rock explosion. His first band was Ramble and the Descendants, where he played organ and sang. Mayo played with several other local bands and had plans to attend Juilliard School in New York City. His career took a detour when he suffered injuries in a serious car accident at the age of seventeen, but Mayo was determined and he was able to move on.

In 1971, Mayo formed Doc Holliday with Frank Carillo, Tom Arlotta, and Bob Liggio. He then joined Rat Race Choir (73-74) one of the Tri-State area's best bands, playing guitar. He then left RRC, was replaced with Mark Hitt and teamed up with Peter Frampton and joined his touring band. Because of this, he appeared on Frampton's album Frampton Comes Alive!. It was on this recording, following Mayo's Fender Rhodes electric piano solo on the song "Do You Feel Like We Do", that Frampton introduced him with the words "Bob Mayo on the keyboards... Bob Mayo!" Mayo also appeared on the Frampton albums I'm in You and Where I Should Be.

In 1980, Mayo left Frampton's band to focus on recording. During this time, he recorded with Joe Walsh and Joe Vitale. Later he joined the touring band for Foreigner and played keyboards on "Waiting for a Girl Like You" and "Break It Up". He spent the next two years touring with Foreigner, and also toured with Dan Fogelberg and Hall & Oates in the late 1980s. He continued to tour with Hall & Oates until 1998.

In 1981, Mayo was asked by Joey Kramer of Aerosmith to play keyboards in his band Renegade fronted by vocalist Marge Raymond. In 1983, Mayo played keyboards on Aerosmith's first tour in three years, in support of their Rock in a Hard Place album, also adding background vocals. Also in 1983, Mayo played in Robert Plant's touring band for The Principle of Moments world tour. The 2007 Rhino re-issue of The Principle of Moments contains three live tracks from that tour.

In 1992, Mayo returned to work with Peter Frampton. The resulting tour turned into the recording of the album "Frampton Comes Alive II". He also appeared on the Live in Detroit CD & DVD as well as Peter Frampton's 2003 recording Now.

On February 23, 2004, Mayo was touring with Peter Frampton in Basel, Switzerland, when he had a heart attack and died. Frampton said regarding him, "Bob was like a brother to me. I have lost a close personal friend and a talented, professional and outstanding musician."

Discography

Peter Frampton
Frampton Comes Alive! (1976)
I'm in You (1977)
Where I Should Be (1979)
Rise Up (1980)
Peter Frampton (1994)
Frampton Comes Alive! II (1995)
Live in Detroit (2000)
Now (2003)
Live in San Francisco March 24, 1975 (2004)

Foreigner
4 (1981)

Agent Provocateur  (1984)

Joe Walsh
There Goes the Neighborhood (1981)

Joe Vitale
Plantation Harbor (1981)

Robert Plant
The Principle of Moments (1983) (2007 reissue)

Procol Harum
The Prodigal Stranger (1991) (lead guitar on unreleased track "Into the Flood")

Daryl Hall and John Oates
Change of Season (1990)

References

External links
BobMayo.net

1951 births
2004 deaths
American rock guitarists
American male guitarists
Iona Preparatory School alumni
Hall & Oates members
Musicians from New York City
20th-century American guitarists
20th-century American male singers
20th-century American singers
21st-century American keyboardists
20th-century American keyboardists